

April 3, 2011 
Early in the morning Somali troops and Raskamboni troops launched an attack on the strategic town of Dhobley, a few hundred Somali troops attacked the town from the Kenyan border. After a few hours of attacks the Somali troops seized Dhobley, resulting in a counterattack from Al Shabaab. Al Shabaab received reinforcements from Afmadow and Kismayo but the counterattack failed. Somali Armed Forces remained control over Dhobley and lost 3 soldiers during these operations.

References

Jubbada Hoose
2011 in Somalia
Conflicts in 2011

Battles in 2011